Korean School of Malaysia (KSMY) is a Korean international school in Cyberjaya, Sepang District, Selangor, Malaysia, in the Klang Valley region (Kuala Lumpur area).

It opened in September 2016 with 70 students in primary school and 14 students in preschool, becoming the first Korean international school in that country. The government of South Korea and the Korean community of Malaysia funded the school.

References

External links
 Korean School of Malaysia 

Malaysia
Primary schools in Malaysia
International schools in Selangor
2016 establishments in Malaysia
Educational institutions established in 2016
Malaysia–South Korea relations
Sepang District